Pirun nyrkki (English: Piru's Fist), released on 29 March 2006 by Spinefarm Records, is the second full-length album from the Finnish industrial metal band Turmion Kätilöt. A pirunnyrkki is also a wooden puzzle, called a burr puzzle or a piston puzzle in English.

Track listing

References

2006 albums
Turmion Kätilöt albums